Yusuf Mert Tunç (born 18 September 2000) is a Turkish footballer who plays as a forward for TFF Third League club 52 Orduspor on loan from İstanbulspor.

Career statistics

Club

Notes

References

2000 births
People from Çankırı Province
Living people
Turkish footballers
Association football forwards
Beşiktaş J.K. footballers
Fenerbahçe S.K. footballers
Boluspor footballers
Varzim S.C. players
İstanbulspor footballers
TFF First League players
Liga Portugal 2 players
TFF Third League players
Turkish expatriate footballers
Expatriate footballers in Portugal
Turkish expatriate sportspeople in Portugal